Carolina Arbeláez Castaño (born 8 March 1995) is a Colombian footballer who plays as a full back. She is currently been a member of the Colombia women's national team.

Club career
After playing nine years in Colombia, on 23 December 2019, Arbeláez signed for Spanish Primera División club Deportivo La Coruña.

International career
Arbeláez made her international debut in September 2014 when team Colombia took on Uruguay. Arbeláez was called up to play for team Colombia in the 2015 FIFA Women's World Cup in May 2015.

References

External links
Carolina Arbeláez at BDFútbol
 
 Carolina Arbeláez profile fifa.com

1995 births
Living people
Footballers from Medellín
Colombian women's footballers
Women's association football fullbacks
Atlético Nacional (women) players
Atlético Huila (women) players
Deportivo de La Coruña (women) players
Primera División (women) players
Colombia women's international footballers
2015 FIFA Women's World Cup players
Footballers at the 2016 Summer Olympics
Olympic footballers of Colombia
Colombian expatriate women's footballers
Colombian expatriate sportspeople in Spain
Expatriate women's footballers in Spain